Eighton Banks is a small village in the Metropolitan Borough of Gateshead, which is located around  from Newcastle upon Tyne.

The village is bordered by Birtley, Harlow Green and Wrekenton, and is located near to Antony Gormley's Angel of the North sculpture at Low Eighton.

Demography 
The data below shows that 51.9% of the population in the Lamesley electoral ward are female, and 48.1% are male. This compares similarly with both the average in the Metropolitan Borough of Gateshead, as well as the national average.

A total of 1.9% of the population were from a black, Asian and minority ethnic (BAME) group. This figure is significantly lower than that of the national average , as well as being somewhat lower than the borough average .

Data from the Office for National Statisticsfound that the average life expectancy in the Lamesley electoral ward is 77.9 years for men, and 79.6 years for women. These statistics compare less than favourably for men, when compared to the average life expectancy in the North East of England, of 77.4 years for men, and 81.4 years for women.

Car ownership is lower than the national average , but is slightly higher than the average in the borough , with 65.3% of households in the ward having access to at least one car.

Education 
Primary education is provided at nearby Fell Dyke Community Primary School and St. Oswald's Catholic Primary School in Wrekenton, as well as Springwell Village Primary School.

In terms of secondary education, students attend the nearby Cardinal Hume Catholic School in Wrekenton, as well as Lord Lawson of Beamish Academy in Birtley, Grace College in Low Fell, and St. Robert of Newminster Catholic School in Washington.

Governance 
Lamesley is a local council ward in the Metropolitan Borough of Gateshead.

, the ward is served by three councillors: Mary Foy, Michael Hood and Sheila Gallagher.

Eighton Banks is located within the parliamentary constituency of Gateshead, and is served by Labour Member of Parliament (MP), Ian Mearns.

Transport

Air 

Bus 
Eighton Banks is served by three buses per hour to Chester-le-Street, Gateshead and Newcastle upon Tyne.

Rail 

Road 
Eighton Banks is located near to the A1 and A1231 roads. By road, Gateshead and Newcastle can be reached in around 15 minutes, and Newcastle International Airport in 25 minutes.

Notable people 

 Norman Hunter – A former Leeds United and England footballer, who was born and grew up in the village.

External links 

 Gateshead Central Taxis 23 timetable
 Go North East 25 timetable
 Go North East 28, 28A & 28B timetable

References

Gateshead